The Haplotaxida are one of two orders within the annelid subclass Oligochaeta, the other being the Lumbriculida. No real common name exists, but they are simply referred to as haplotaxids.

Given that the other clitellatan annelids are embedded between and around the Haplotaxida and Lumbriculida, the traditional Oligochaeta are a paraphyletic assemblage. Thus, the Haplotaxida might eventually be up-ranked to subclass status within the Clitellata or an expanded Oligochaeta, with the present suborders advancing to order rank. The latter – though without merging the Oligochaeta and Clitellata – has been proposed time and again in the past, most prominently for the distinct Moniligastrina.

Families
Of the four suborders of Haplotaxida, two are minor lineages, monotypic at family level. Another one, the Tubificina, is sizeable and contains the aquatic worms, while the fourth, the earthworms or Lumbricina, unites the bulk of the order's families:

Suborder Haplotaxina
 Haplotaxidae

Suborder Moniligastrina
 Moniligastridae

Suborder Lumbricina
 Alluroididae
 Eudrilidae
 Glossoscolecidae
 Lumbricidae
 Hormogastridae
 Ailoscolidae
 Lutodrilidae
 Sparganophilidae
 Criodrilidae
 Ocnerodrilidae
 Acanthodrilidae
 Octochaetidae
 Exxidae
 Megascolecidae
 Microchaetidae

Suborder Tubificina
 Dorydrilidae
 Enchytraeidae
 Naididae (including Tubificidae)
 Opistocystidae
 Phreodrilidae

See also
 
 

 
Protostome orders